Kulspruta m/42 (ksp m/42), Swedish designation for a heavily modified, license-built derivative of the M1919A6 chambered in 6.5×55mm or 8×63mm patron m/32 and from 1975 in 7.62×51mm NATO.

The Ksp m/42B was a lighter version with a distinctive bipod, shoulder stock (used in a similar way as the M1919A6) and a spade grip chambered in 6.5×55mm and later in 7.62×51mm which can be recognised in its corrosion resistant green finish.

It was used by Swedish forces during the Congo Crisis.

References

External links
KAF frontpage

7.62×51mm NATO machine guns
Medium machine guns
Machine guns of Sweden
Weapons and ammunition introduced in 1942